Gonystylus eximius is a tree in the family Thymelaeaceae. The specific epithet eximius means "excellent".

Description
The twigs are yellowish brown. Its flowers are reddish brown.

Distribution and habitat
Gonystylus eximius is endemic to Borneo, where it is known only from Sarawak.

References

eximius
Endemic flora of Borneo
Trees of Borneo
Flora of Sarawak
Plants described in 1973